A Prohibited Steps Order is a court order in the United Kingdom common in divorce and separation cases. An example of where a Prohibited Steps Order might be applied for is to prevent one parent from taking a child out of the country.

See also
Child Arrangement Order
Parental Responsibility Order

References

Family law in the United Kingdom